The 1982 FIVB Men's World Championship was the tenth edition of the tournament, organised by the world's governing body, the FIVB. It was held from 1 to 15 October 1982 in Argentina.

Qualification

* India withdrew and were replaced by Iraq.

Squads

Venues

Pools composition
The teams are seeded based on their final ranking at the 1978 FIVB Men's World Championship.

Results

First round

Pool A

|}

|}

Pool B

|}

|}

Pool C

|}

|}

Pool D

|}

|}

Pool E

|}

|}

Pool F

|}

|}

Second round
The results and the points of the matches between the same teams that were already played during the preliminary round shall be taken into account for the second round.

1st–12th pools

Pool W

|}

Location: Rosario

|}

Location: Buenos Aires

|}

Pool X

|}

Location: Mendoza

|}

Location: Catamarca

|}

13th–24th pools

Pool Y

|}

Location: Buenos Aires

|}

Location: Rosario

|}

Pool Z

|}

|}

Final round

21st–24th places

21st–24th semifinals

|}

23rd place match

|}

21st place match

|}

17th–20th places

17th–20th semifinals

|}

19th place match

|}

17th place match

|}

13th–16th places

13th–16th semifinals

|}

15th place match

|}

13th place match

|}

9th–12th places

9th–12th semifinals

|}

11th place match

|}

9th place match

|}

5th–8th places

5th–8th semifinals

|}

7th place match

|}

5th place match

|}

Finals

Semifinals

|}

3rd place match

|}

Final

|}

Final standing

References

External links
 Federation Internationale de Volleyball
 Results

W
V
V
Sports competitions in Buenos Aires
FIVB Volleyball Men's World Championship